A baby gate or child safety gate is a protective barrier designed to prevent babies and toddlers from accessing areas of a home that may not be safe for them, such as stairways and kitchens. Baby gates are typically constructed of metal, plastic and/or wood, and can be expanded to fit in a range of doorway widths. They may be designed for use indoors or out, and may be either hardware or pressure-mounted.

Pressure-mounted gates are typically held in place by friction with the walls on either side, while hardware-mounted gates are screwed into the wall studs and swing fully open like a door. There are hardware-mounted gates that can be customized to fit wide and irregularly shaped openings, as well as mesh retractable gates that roll out of the way.

Baby gates are also frequently used to contain small pets, especially ones that are not housebroken. A pet gate may not meet the voluntary standard for baby gates. 

Baby gates are typically removed once a child is capable of opening or climbing over the gate.

See also
Childproofing
Child care
Playwork
Babysitting
Child development

References

External links

 International Association for Child Safety
 ASTM F1004-04 – Standard Consumer Safety Specification for Expansion Gates and Expandable Enclosures

Child safety
Protective barriers